The 2021–22 Serbian football will be the 16th season of the Serbian football since its establishment in 2006.

Men's football

SuperLiga

First League

UEFA competitions

Round of 16

Knockout of play-offs

Round of 16

References

2021–22 in Serbian football